Sabrina Sultana (born March 1, 1975) is a Bangladeshi sport shooter. She competed at the 2000 Summer Olympics in the women's 50 metre rifle three positions event, in which she placed 38th, and the women's 10 metre air rifle event, in which she placed 46th.

References

External links
 

1975 births
Living people
ISSF rifle shooters
Bangladeshi female sport shooters
Olympic shooters of Bangladesh
Shooters at the 2000 Summer Olympics
Shooters at the 1994 Asian Games
Shooters at the 2002 Asian Games
Shooters at the 2010 Asian Games
Asian Games competitors for Bangladesh